George William Coventry, 7th Earl of Coventry (25 April 1758 – 26 March 1831), styled Viscount Deerhurst until 1809, was a British peer and Member of Parliament.

Life
On 7 May 1776, Coventry was commissioned an ensign in the 64th Regiment of Foot. On 21 January 1777, he became a lieutenant in the 17th Regiment of Light Dragoons.

In 1776 he had eloped to Gretna Green with Lady Catherine Henley, daughter of the Earl of Northington, leading to a long-standing estrangement from his father, the 6th Earl.  Forbidden to return home, he spent much time with his friend Sir Richard Worsley, 7th Baronet at Appuldurcombe House, Isle of Wight.

He had an affair with Lady Worsley and was later involved in her scandalous elopement with George Bisset in 1781, and the subsequent trial.

Deerhurst was later appointed lieutenant-colonel of the Worcestershire Militia on 10 May 1806.

He succeeded his father George Coventry, 6th Earl of Coventry as Lord Lieutenant of Worcestershire in 1808 and as Earl of Coventry in 1809.

Family
In 1783, Coventry married Peggy Pitches, daughter of the brandy merchant Sir Abraham Pitches. They had five sons including the future 8th Earl, and six daughters, one son and one daughter dying young:

Lady Barbara (d. 4 Sep 1838) married Lt.-Col. Alexander Charles Craufurd, son of Sir James Gregan-Craufurd, 2nd Baronet
Lady Sophia Catherine (d. 29 Mar 1875) married twice. Firstly, Sir Roger Gresley, 8th Baronet, on 2 June 1821. After Sir Roger's death, she married secondly, Rev. Lt.-Col. Sir Henry William Des Voeux, 3rd Baronet. She had no issue with either of them.
George, 8th Earl of Coventry (16 Oct 1784 – 15 May 1843)
Lady Augusta Maria (circa 1786 - 1 Nov 1865) married Lt.-Gen. Sir Willoughby Cotton on 16 May 1806. They had two sons and one daughter.
Hon. William James (1 Jan 1797 – 11 Mar 1877)

Upon his death in 1831, he was succeeded by his son, George.

References

External links

1758 births
1831 deaths
17th Lancers officers
Lord-Lieutenants of Worcestershire
North Staffordshire Regiment officers
British Militia officers
Earls of Coventry